David West, RSW (1868–1936) was a watercolour painter of land, sea and sky. He was born on 12 November 1868 in Lossiemouth, the youngest of 12 children, and died 8 October 1936 in Glasgow following a seizure.

Life and career
West was the son of Captain James West, commander of a sailing schooner.  His early education was at Lossiemouth and then Elgin Academy.   West’s parents moved to Aberdeen in 1883 and so he became a pupil at the Aberdeen Grammar School which he left the following year to go to sea with his father.  Before this, he found time to attend the Aberdeen Mechanics Institute and studied life drawing.  During his time as a seaman he continued to paint culminating in his award of a gold medal at the Industry and Art Exhibition in Aberdeen in 1888.  From 1889 to 1894, West exhibited at the Royal Scottish Academy and the Royal Academy in London.  That five-year period saw him being accepted for the Royal Academy on successive years.

When still in his twenties he had won for himself a wide reputation as a watercolour landscape painter.  In 1892 he was commissioned by the Countess of Aberdeen to undertake a number of paintings for her.  He was well rewarded by the Countess and so in early 1893 he traveled to the Netherlands to study Dutch art. He returned that same year to Lossiemouth and set up a studio.  In 1897, this studio burned down and he lost many paintings including several that he had done in oils.

It was soon after this that he left for British Columbia to take part in the Klondike Gold Rush.  West and his party slept on the summit of the Chilkoot Pass on 13 and 14 May 1898.  The Banffshire Herald ran an account of his travels under the title "On the way to the Klondyke":
Camped at Lake Inderman, Alaska, May 23rd 1898.  We got through the great Chilkoot  pass safely, and saw the great snowslide where so many were killed.  The heat today was great and the snow and  ice are going fast, and in a few days we will be in our canoes and on our way to the ‘Golden Yukon’.  I hope I’ll pull through whether I have gold or not.  I can hardly get peace to write for a young Yank laying off yarns about his father and uncle in the American [Civil] War.  I am in grand health and I feel fit.  The scenery is grand and I’ll have a good stock of sketches, and with my Kodak camera I’ll have something [of] worth.

He returned to Lossiemouth in November 1898 with numerous sketches and photographs and exhibited four of his Klondike paintings at the RSA the following year.

In 1903, the Society of Scottish Artists chose West to represent them at the Munich Exhibition.  He was elected a Member of The Royal Scottish Society of Painters in Watercolour on 19 February 1908 and exhibited extensively at the Society's Annual Exhibitions and also those of The Royal Glasgow Institute of Fine Arts.

He earned his living as a painter, but had other interests. He was an outdoor type of person, enjoying golfing, shooting and angling. West was also a local politician beginning on the Drainie Parish Council, then the Lossiemouth Town Council and finally the Morayshire County Council.  His political views were of a conservative nature.

He joined the army in April 1915 to become an ambulance driver at the age of 47. He was soon wounded and was discharged in October 1915.

In 1927, he was invited to Buenos Aires, Argentina to hold a one-man exhibition.  He was the first British artist to do this.  He took full advantage of his journey and despite being nearly sixty, undertook long and arduous excursions to Chile and Brazil and painted a series of landscapes.  West’s paintings were largely of Morayshire scenes but one of his most famous paintings was the Dutch landscape "On the Scheldt" which was hung in Edinburgh in 1932.  He was elected as Vice-President of the RSW in 1935.

He died on 7 October 1936 in Glasgow while attending the Royal Glasgow Institute of Fine Arts where he had several paintings on show.  Two paintings were posthumously exhibited at the same venue in 1937.

Style
As a painter of the sea, the sandy wastes and the sky along the Moray Firth coast, and of old sailing boats he was unsurpassed.  His work continues to be sought after at auction demonstrating the quality of his work.  His paintings were always an accurate depiction of the view.
  
Most of his work has a characteristic low skyline. This allowed West to show the wide range of light effects on the Moray Firth water. This depiction of water and sky while at the same time depicting the accurate images of the fishing towns (mainly, but not exclusively, Lossiemouth) was a hallmark of his painting.  He could paint his beloved Moray Firth in all its moods, whether it be calm or stormy.  His landscape paintings are equally appealing capturing the colours of the Morayshire moorland, the abundant whins and cloud formations.

Mainly known for his watercolours he also possessed great skill in oil painting and the painting of miniatures.  In 1923, he was invited to produce a painting to be hung in Queen Mary's dollhouse designed by the architect Sir Edwin Lutyens for Queen Mary.

Link

1868 births
1936 deaths
19th-century Scottish painters
Scottish male painters
20th-century Scottish painters
People of the Klondike Gold Rush
People from Lossiemouth
Scottish watercolourists
People educated at Aberdeen Grammar School
Persons of National Historic Significance (Canada)
19th-century Scottish male artists
20th-century Scottish male artists